Mutair Al-Zahrani (born 22 October 1994) is a Saudi Arabian professional footballer who plays as a midfielder for Saudi Professional League side Abha.

Career
Al-Zahrani started his career at the youth team of Al-Ain and represented the club at every level. Al-Zahrani achieved promotion with Al-Ain to the Pro League for the first time in the club's history. On 17 August 2020, Al-Zahrani joined Al-Taawoun. On 26 June 2021, Al-Zahrani joined Abha on a two-year deal.

References

External links
 

1994 births
Living people
Saudi Arabian footballers
Association football midfielders
Al-Ain FC (Saudi Arabia) players
Al-Taawoun FC players
Abha Club players
Saudi Fourth Division players
Saudi Second Division players
Saudi First Division League players
Saudi Professional League players